Toyokazu Fujishima (born 8 July 1981) is a Japanese professional golfer.

Fujishima plays on the Japan Golf Tour, where he has won once.

Professional wins (1)

Japan Golf Tour wins (1)

Japan Golf Tour playoff record (1–1)

Team appearances
Amateur
Eisenhower Trophy (representing Japan): 2002

External links

Japanese male golfers
Japan Golf Tour golfers
Asian Games medalists in golf
Asian Games bronze medalists for Japan
Golfers at the 2002 Asian Games
Medalists at the 2002 Asian Games
Sportspeople from Kumamoto Prefecture
1981 births
Living people